Innis Gaines (born August 29, 1998) is an American football free safety for the Green Bay Packers of the National Football League (NFL).

Early life and education
Gaines was born on August 29, 1998, in Beaumont, Texas. He attended West Brook High School in Beaumont, recording 124 tackles, five interceptions, and two fumble recoveries as a senior. He was a four-star safety according to 247Sports.com and was ranked as the number four safety in the state of Texas. He committed to TCU over offers from Texas A&M and Arkansas.

As a freshman in 2016, he appeared in ten games and made two tackles. As a sophomore, Gaines appeared in all 14 games, making two starts. He finished the year with 37 tackles, 6-for-loss, and 2 quarterback sacks. As a junior, Gaines started the first six games of the year before going out with an injury. He totaled 31 tackles in the year. Following the 2018 season, he was named second-team all-Big 12 Conference by Pro Football Focus. As a senior, he started the first eight games before again being sidelined due to injury. He made a total of 34 tackles in the year, placing seventh on the team.

Professional career

Gaines went unselected in the 2020 NFL Draft, and only received one tryout due to COVID-19 restrictions. While a free agent, he worked for DoorDash. The Green Bay Packers, who held the tryout, gave him a futures contract on January 8, 2021. Gaines was released at the final roster cuts in August  but re-signed to the practice squad the next day. He was activated from the practice squad to the active roster for their game against the Cleveland Browns, and made his NFL debut in the 24–22 win, making one tackle. 

On January 25, 2022, he signed a reserve/future contract with the Packers. He was waived/injured on August 30, and placed on injured reserve. He was released on September 9.

On October 11, 2022, Gaines received a tryout from the New York Jets. He was signed again by the Packers on October 18 to the practice squad and was elevated to the active roster on October 29, 2022. On November 26, 2022, he was elevated to the active roster from the practice squad. On November 29, 2022, the Packers signed Gaines to the active roster.

NFL career statistics

Regular season

References

External links
Green Bay Packers bio
TCU Horned Frogs bio

1998 births
Living people
Players of American football from Texas
TCU Horned Frogs football players
American football defensive backs
Green Bay Packers players
Sportspeople from Beaumont, Texas